The Goal of the Month is, like the Goal of the Year, the ARD Goal of the Decade and Goal of the Century, an individual soccer award selected by viewers of Sportschau (German TV channel ARD). Honored are spectacular or important football goals mostly scored in or for Germany.

Winners
(Rows in bold are also Goals of the Year.)

1971

1972

1973

1974

1975

1976

1977

1978

1979

1980

2004

2009

2010

2011

2012

2013

2014

Details
The Goal of the Month Award and the Goal of the Year Award were incepted in 1971 by the German TV station ARD, back then one of only two public broadcasting agencies in Germany, in its Saturday evening "Sportschau" report in the channel of Das Erste. Each month, the GotM is held, and five especially spectacular, unusual or important goals are shortlisted for the viewers to vote on. Initially in the 1970s, votes were cast per mail, but nowadays votes are commonly cast per telephone or per Internet. The winner receives a golden plaque.

Up to 12 winners (usually less due to breaks in winter and summer) are eligible for the big annual event, the GotY Award. Again, the goal with the most votes wins. Parallel to this, the 10 annual winners may participate in the Goal of the Decade Award, and in 1999, the three Goals of the Decade of the 70s, 80s and 90s squared off for the Goal of the Century Award, see above.

Records 
first GotM winner: Gerhard Faltermeier of Jahn Regensburg
 most GotM: 10, Lukas Podolski, of which 8 were scored within only 27 months (January 2004 to April 2006)
7 GotM: Jürgen Klinsmann, between 1986 and 1999
6 GotM:
Karl-Heinz Rummenigge (1979–1984)
Mario Basler (1992–1999) 
Klaus Fischer (1975–2003)
 Fischer also holds the record for longest stretch between GotMs: 28 years, scoring in a "veterans match" between Bayern Munich and 1860 Munich on 30 July 2003, at age 53, in the 6th minute of the 0–1 (final 4–4) game, again with his trademark bicycle kick (awarded for the third time).
 5 GotM:
Gerd Müller (1972–1976) 
Rudi Völler (1987–1990) 
 4 GotM:
Günter Netzer, Oliver Bierhoff and others

Teams (as of February 2011):
61 FC Bayern Munich
46 Men's national teams (FIFA team, Under 21 team, Olympic team)
35 Borussia Mönchengladbach
33 1. FC Köln

Most GotM per Team and Year:
6 Borussia Mönchengladbach (in 1973)

Additional notes
See also :Category:kicker-Torjägerkanone Award winners for the top scorer of each season.

References

External links
 ARD-Sportschau 

Football in Germany lists
German football trophies and awards
Association football goal of the month awards